Adam Zeman (born December 9, 1991) is a Czech professional ice hockey player. He currently plays with HC Dukla Jihlava in the First National Hockey League.

Zeman made his Czech Extraliga debut playing with HC Pardubice during the 2013–14 Czech Extraliga season.

References

External links

1991 births
Czech ice hockey forwards
HC Dynamo Pardubice players
Living people
Sportspeople from Jihlava
HC Frýdek-Místek players
VHK Vsetín players
HC Olomouc players
HC Dukla Jihlava players